is a Japanese film, television and voice actor. He has appeared in more than 80 films since 1979.

He is the son of Osamu Ishiguro, a former tennis player.

Selected filmography

Film

Television

References

External links
 

1966 births
Living people
People from Tokyo
Japanese male child actors
Japanese male film actors
Japanese male television actors
Seijo University alumni